The John Cotting House is a historic house at 74 Main Street in Marlborough, Massachusetts.

Description and history 
The two story wood-frame house was built c. 1851, and is one of the city's few temple-front Greek Revival houses. John Cotting was the son of Amos Cotting, a doctor, and operated a tavern nearby. In the 20th century it was used by the local chapter of the Knights of Columbus.

The house was listed on the National Register of Historic Places on August 16, 1984. It is currently the location for the law offices of Stephen G. Morte, Joseph J. Connolly, and Sem Aykanian.

See also
National Register of Historic Places listings in Marlborough, Massachusetts

References

Houses on the National Register of Historic Places in Middlesex County, Massachusetts
Buildings and structures in Marlborough, Massachusetts
Houses completed in 1851
Greek Revival houses in Massachusetts